The Uganda Girl Guides Association is the national Guiding organization of Uganda. It serves 112,371 members (as of 2008). Founded in 1914, the girls-only organization became a full member of the World Association of Girl Guides and Girl Scouts in 1963.

Blandina Karungi was one of the first girls in Uganda to become a Girl Guide. She was both deaf and blind.

See also

The Uganda Scouts Association

References

World Association of Girl Guides and Girl Scouts member organizations
Scouting and Guiding in Uganda
Youth organizations established in 1914